Fateh is an adventure film. The film starring Nav Bajwa, Samiksha Singh, Yaad Grewal, Supreet Bedi, Puneet Issar, Navneet Nishan, Deep Dhillon, Shivendra Mahal, Gurpreet Ghuggi and Karamjit Anmol, is the first Punjabi film to be made on martial arts. It is a film on enduring Punjabi culture depicting sword and stick art that teaches that perseverance can lead to triumph.

Cast

 Nav Bajwa as Fateh Singh
 Sameksha Singh as Sehaj
 Yaad Grewal as Sangram
 Puneet Issar as Pratap Singh
 Deep Dhillon as Jarnail Sing
 Shavindra Mahal
 Gurpreet Ghuggi as Taareef
 Karamjit Anmol as Besti
 Supreet Bedi

Crew

 Written & Directed by - Jaspreet Rajan
 Producers - Jyotdeep Singh & Munjan Preet Singh
 Creative Director - Gurdeep Singh
 Executive Producers - Gurdeep Singh / R.P. Singh
 Dialogues -  Gurminder Singh Samad & Parveen Kumar
 Screenplay - Gurminder Singh Samad
 Dop - Basha Lal
 Editor - Biren Mohanty
 Music - Kuljit Singh Studio FMbox 98/9 Centraltown Jalandhar & Tigerstyle (U.K)
 Lyrics - Raj Kakra, Kashmir Thakarwal
 Singers - Mika Singh, Lehmber Hussainpuri, Jasbir Jassi, Kavita Seth, Feroz Khan, Karamjit Anmol, Raja Hasan

Awards

PTC Punjabi Film Awards 2015

Nominated for 
PTC Punjabi Film Award for Best Story - Jaspreet Rajan
PTC Punjabi Film Award for Best Lyricist for Khoon Di Fitrat
PTC Punjabi Film Award for Best Playback Singer (Female) - Kavita Seth for Ishqa Ishqa
PTC Punjabi Film Award for Best Playback Singer (Male) - Raja Hasan for Khoon Di Fitrat
PTC Punjabi Film Award for Best Performance in a Negative Role - Yaad Grewal
PTC Punjabi Film Award for Best Supporting Actor - Puneet Issar
PTC Punjabi Film Award for Best Debut Female - Supreet Bedi
PTC Punjabi Film Award for Best Debut Director - Jaspreet Rajan
PTC Punjabi Film Award for Best Actor - Nav Bajwa

References

2014 films
Punjabi-language Indian films
2010s Punjabi-language films